Endoclita aroura is a species of moth of the family Hepialidae. It is known from Sumatra. The food plant for this species is Tectona.

References

External links
Hepialidae genera

Moths described in 1958
Hepialidae